The 1962 United States Senate election in Nevada was held on November 6, 1962. Incumbent Democratic U.S. Senator Alan Bible was re-elected to a second term in office over Republican William B. Wright.

General election

Candidates
Alan Bible, incumbent U.S. Senator since 1954 (Democratic)
William B. Wright (Republican)

Results

See also 
 1962 United States Senate elections

References

Nevada
1962
United States Senate